Sabce is a department or commune of Bam Province in north-western Burkina Faso. Its capital lies at the town of Sabce. According to the 1996 census the department has a total population of 22,282.

Towns and villages
 Sabce  Bangrin  Bissa  Boussouma Foursa  Goungla  Imiougou  Koumnogo Kougsabla Koukoundi Loungo Lefourba Lefourba-Foulbé Mafoulou Mafoulou-Foulbé Noh
 Ouéguéla Ouintini Ouintini Ouazélé Ronguin Rounou Sanhoui Siguinvoussé Souryala Sorgho-Peulh Tanga-Pela Toublongo Zandkom Zandkom-Peulh

References

Departments of Burkina Faso
Bam Province